The 2009 Carisap Tennis Cup was a professional tennis tournament played on outdoor red clay courts. This was the fifth edition of the tournament which was part of the 2009 ATP Challenger Tour. It took place in San Benedetto, Italy between 6 and 12 July 2009.

Singles entrants

Seeds

 Rankings are as of June 29, 2009.

Other entrants
The following players received wildcards into the singles main draw:
  Fabio Fognini
  Giacomo Miccini
  Guillermo Olaso
  Stefano Travaglia

The following players received entry from the qualifying draw:
  Sergio Gutiérrez-Ferrol
  Martin Kližan
  Pedro Sousa
  Cristian Villagrán

Champions

Singles

 Fabio Fognini def.  Cristian Villagrán, 6–7(5), 7–6(2), 6–0

Doubles

 Stefano Ianni /  Cristian Villagrán def.  Niels Desein /  Stéphane Robert, 7–6(3), 1–6, [10–6]

References
Official website

Carisap Tennis Cup
Clay court tennis tournaments
ATP Challenger San Benedetto